Kozhukhovskaya is a station on Moscow Metro's Lyublinsko-Dmitrovskaya line. Named after the district it is located in, the station was opened on December 28, 1995 as part of the first stage of the Lyublinsky radius. The station is a single vaulted design with a back vault to accommodate for the additional hydroisolation required.

The theme of the decoration is history of automobile design which shows the perfection of the station walls made of white marble turning into a large aluminum ceiling. Darker, brown marble is used for lower regions of the back vault and lighting comes from very large and contrasting red metallic structures hanging from the main vault. Grey granite also contributes to the station's very bright appearance. The architects are A.Vigdorov and L.Borzenkov.

The station has one vestibule with a glazed pavilion on the corner of Yuzhnoportovaya and Trofimova streets.

References

External links
 Metro.ru
 mosmetro.ru
 mymetro.ru
 news.metro.ru
 KartaMetro.info — Station location and exits on Moscow map (English/Russian)

Moscow Metro stations
Railway stations in Russia opened in 1995
Lyublinsko-Dmitrovskaya Line
Railway stations located underground in Russia